Paramormyrops is a genus of elephantfish in the family Mormyridae from Africa.

Species
There are currently 11 recognized species in this genus:

 Paramormyrops batesii (Boulenger 1906) (Kribi mormyrid)
 Paramormyrops curvifrons (Taverne, Thys van den Audenaerde, Heymer & Géry, 1977) (Ivindo mormyrid)
 Paramormyrops gabonensis Taverne, Thys van den Audenaerde & Heymer 1977 (Makokou mormyrid)
 Paramormyrops hopkinsi (Taverne & Thys van den Audenaerde 1985) (Ivindo electric fish)
 Paramormyrops jacksoni (Poll 1967) (Ghost stonebasher)
 Paramormyrops kingsleyae (Günther 1896) (Old Calabar mormyrid)
 Paramormyrops longicaudatus (Taverne, Thys van den Audenaerde, Heymer & Géry 1977) (longtailed mormyrid)
 Paramormyrops ntotom Rich, Sullivan & Hopkins 2017 (Doume elephantfish)
 Paramormyrops retrodorsalis (Nichols & Griscom, 1917) (Bima elephantfish)
 Paramormyrops sphekodes (Sauvage 1879)
Paramormyrops tavernei (Poll 1972) (Kipepe elephantfish)

References 

Weakly electric fish
Mormyridae
Ray-finned fish genera